The men's decathlon was a track and field athletics event held as part of the athletics at the 1912 Summer Olympics programme. The competition was held from Saturday, July 13, 1912, to Monday, July 15, 1912. It was the first time the decathlon, which had been introduced in 1911, was held at the Olympics; a different ten-event competition, the all-around, had been contested in St. Louis in 1904. Twenty-nine decathletes from twelve nations competed. NOCs could enter up to 12 athletes.

Results
Jim Thorpe's gold medal was stripped by the International Olympic Committee in 1913, after the IOC learned that Thorpe had taken expense money for playing baseball, violating contemporary Olympic amateurism rules, before the 1912 Games. This moved everyone else up in the rankings. In 1982, the IOC was convinced that the disqualification had been improper, as no protest against Thorpe's eligibility had been brought within the required 30 days, and reinstated Thorpe's medals. This made Thorpe and Wieslander co-champions. In 2022, the IOC decided to display Thorpe as the sole gold medal winner  after the Swedish Olympic Committee and Wieslander's surviving family members declared Thorpe should be acknowledged as the sole Olympic Champion.

Avery Brundage, president of the IOC from 1952 to 1972, competed in the decathlon finishing in 16th place. Brundage did not start in the last two events of the competition.

100 metres

Long jump

| width="40%" align="left" valign="top" |

| width="60%" align="left" valign="top" |

Shot put

| width="40%" align="left" valign="top" |

| width="60%" align="left" valign="top" |

High jump

6 of the 29 starters did not appear for the fourth event.

| width="40%" align="left" valign="top" |

| width="60%" align="left" valign="top" |

400 metres

5 more athletes, including the 6th-placed Nilsson, retired after the high jump and did not appear for the fifth event.  This brought the number of non-finishers up to 11, leaving 18 to continue the competition.

| width="40%" align="left" valign="top" |

| width="60%" align="left" valign="top" |

Discus throw

Philbrook scored over 1000 points in the event by breaking the previous Olympic record (listed as 41.46 metres in the 1912 official report, though actually only 40.89 set by Martin Sheridan in 1908).  Since the discus throw event had been held 2 days prior to the decathlon and Armas Taipale had far exceeded the old record, Philbrook's mark was not a new record.  It did vault him from 5th place to 2nd following the 6th event, however.

| width="40%" align="left" valign="top" |

| width="60%" align="left" valign="top" |

110 metre hurdles

| width="40%" align="left" valign="top" |

| width="60%" align="left" valign="top" |

Pole vault

Two more athletes dropped out, leaving 16 left out of the original 29.

| width="40%" align="left" valign="top" |

| width="60%" align="left" valign="top" |

Javelin throw

Only 14 athletes, fewer than half of the original 29, began the penultimate event.

| width="40%" align="left" valign="top" |

| width="60%" align="left" valign="top" |

1500 metres

| width="35%" align="left" valign="top" |

Final standings 

Only 12 of the 29 starters finished the entire decathlon event. Thorpe's disqualification in 1913 and subsequent reinstatement 70 years later resulted in the top 4 finishers being awarded medals—2 gold, a silver, and a bronze. The IOC's 2022 decision to reinstate Thorpe as sole gold medallist resulted in there being two silver medallists instead of two gold.

| width="65%" align="left" valign="top" |

Notes

References
 
 

Decathlon
1912